Gordon Anderson (16 September 1924 – 19 June 1965) was an Australian rules footballer who played with Hawthorn in the Victorian Football League (VFL).

Anderson was a follower and forward, secured by Hawthorn from Blackburn. He had served in the Royal Australian Air Force during World War II.

Anderson was Hawthorn's leading goal-kicker in the 1950 VFL season, with 21 goals, two clear from full-forward Albert Prior, who had played only seven games.

Anderson left Hawthorn in 1952, to coach Surrey Hills.

References

1924 births
Australian rules footballers from Melbourne
Hawthorn Football Club players
Royal Australian Air Force personnel of World War II
1965 deaths
Royal Australian Air Force airmen
People from Coburg, Victoria
Military personnel from Melbourne
Australian rules football coaches